Marko Jevgeni Gaidajenko (born 1 November 2001) is an Estonian ice dancer. With his current partner, Solène Mazingue, he is the 2021 JGP France II bronze medalist, the 2022 Estonian national champion, and competed in the final segment at the 2022 European Championships.

Personal life 
Gaidajenko was born on 1 November 2001 in Tallinn, Estonia.

Career

Early years 
Gaidajenko began learning to skate in 2007. As a novice ice dancer, he competed with Jessenia Tsenkman.

By 2018, Gaidajenko was skating with Darja Netjaga. The two made their ISU Junior Grand Prix (JGP) debut in October 2018, placing eleventh in Ljubljana, Slovenia. During the following JGP season, Netjaga/Gaidajenko finished twelfth in Latvia and thirteenth in Italy. Ranked twenty-fifth in the rhythm dance, they did not advance to the free dance at the 2020 World Junior Championships in Tallinn. They trained in Tallinn and Moscow, coached by Julia Semjonova and Alexei Gorshkov.

2021–2022 season 
Mazingue/Gaidajenko made their international debut in August at the 2021 JGP France II, the second of two events held in Courchevel. There, the team placed fifth in the rhythm dance but rose to third in the free dance to claim the bronze medal overall behind American teams Brown/Brown and Flores/Tsarevski. Their medal marked the first medal for Estonia on the Junior Grand Prix circuit in ice dance since 2011. At their second JGP event, the 2021 JGP Austria, Mazingue/Gaidajenko finished ninth.

Moving up to the senior level, Mazingue/Gaidajenko made their Challenger Series debut in November at the 2021 CS Warsaw Cup. They placed fifteenth at the event. Later in December, they won their first senior national title at the 2022 Estonian Championships before returning to the Challenger Series at the 2021 CS Golden Spin of Zagreb, where they finished ninth. Due to their placement at Estonian nationals, Mazingue/Gaidajenko were assigned to Estonia's berth in ice dance at the 2022 European Championships.

At Europeans, held in Gaidajenko's hometown Tallinn, Mazingue/Gaidajenko set a new personal best in the rhythm dance to qualify to the free dance in 20th place. They maintained their standing in the free dance and finished twentieth overall. Mazingue/Gaidajenko concluded the season at the 2022 World Championships, held in Montpellier with Russian dance teams absent due to the International Skating Union banning all Russian athletes due to their country's invasion of Ukraine. They qualified to the free dance and finished nineteenth.

Programs

With Mazingue

With Netjaga

Competitive highlights 
CS: Challenger Series; JGP: Junior Grand Prix

With Mazingue

With Netjaga

With Tsenkman

Detailed results

With Mazingue

Senior results

Junior results

References

External links 
 

2001 births
Estonian male ice dancers
Living people
Figure skaters from Tallinn
21st-century Estonian people